Prunum magnificum is a species of sea snail, a marine gastropod mollusk in the family Marginellidae, the margin snails.

Distribution
P. magnificum can be found in Caribbean waters, off the northwestern coast of Cuba.

References

Marginellidae
Gastropods described in 1989